Spirostreptus is a genus of giant millipedes of the family Spirostreptidae. It contains the following species:

 Spirostreptus abstemius Karsch, 1881
 Spirostreptus acicollis Porat
 Spirostreptus aciculatus Pocock
 Spirostreptus acutangulus (Brandt, 1841)
 Spirostreptus acutanus Karsch, 1881
 Spirostreptus acutus Humbert & Saussure, 1870
 Spirostreptus adumbratus Porath, 1872
 Spirostreptus aequalis Porath, 1872
 Spirostreptus aguaytianus Chamberlin, 1941
 Spirostreptus alligans Karsch, 1881
 Spirostreptus alticinctus Karsch, 1881
 Spirostreptus amandus Attems, 1914
 Spirostreptus amictus Karsch, 1881
 Spirostreptus amphibolius Karsch, 1881
 Spirostreptus amphobolinus Karsch
 Spirostreptus amputus Karsch, 1881
 Spirostreptus anaulax Attems, 1896
 Spirostreptus anctior Karsch, 1881
 Spirostreptus andersoni Pocock, 1889
 Spirostreptus angolanus Attems, 1934
 Spirostreptus angolensis Karsch, 1881
 Spirostreptus angulicollis Karsch, 1881
 Spirostreptus angustifrons Brölemann, 1902
 Spirostreptus annulatus Porath, 1872
 Spirostreptus antimena Saussure & Zehntner, 1901
 Spirostreptus arcanus Karsch, 1881
 Spirostreptus argus Attems, 1896
 Spirostreptus armatus Verhoeff, 1941
 Spirostreptus asthenes Pocock
 Spirostreptus astrictus Karsch 1881
 Spirostreptus atoporus Chamberlin, 1923
 Spirostreptus atratus Karsch, 1881
 Spirostreptus audouini Brandt 1833
 Spirostreptus bassleri Chamberlin, 1941
 Spirostreptus betsilea Saussure & Zehntner, 1901
 Spirostreptus bidundinus Attems, 1914
 Spirostreptus binodifer Voges, 1878
 Spirostreptus biplicatus Karsch, 1881
 Spirostreptus bisulcatus Attems, 1896
 Spirostreptus bonifatius Attems, 1914
 Spirostreptus bowringii Pocock, 1892
 Spirostreptus boyoricus Attems, 1903
 Spirostreptus brachycerus Gerstäcker, 1873
 Spirostreptus caicarae Humbert & Saussure, 1870
 Spirostreptus californicus Humbert & Saussure, 1870
 Spirostreptus cameroonensis Voges, 1878
 Spirostreptus carinatus Porat, 1894
 Spirostreptus castaneus Attems, 1934
 Spirostreptus caudiculatus Karsch, 1881
 Spirostreptus cavicollis Karsch, 1881
 Spirostreptus cephalotes Voges, 1878
 Spirostreptus chamissoi Karsch, 1881
 Spirostreptus chinchipus Chamberlin, 1941
 Spirostreptus chirographus Karsch, 1881
 Spirostreptus christianus Karsch, 1881
 Spirostreptus cinctatus Newport
 Spirostreptus cinctus Humbert & Saussure, 1870
 Spirostreptus civilis Gerstaecker, 1873
 Spirostreptus clathratus Voges, 1878
 Spirostreptus clavatus Voges, 1878
 Spirostreptus clavipes C. L. Koch, 1847
 Spirostreptus cluniculus Humbert & Saussure, 1870
 Spirostreptus coalitus Attems, 1903
 Spirostreptus coarctatus Porath, 1872
 Spirostreptus collectivus Attems, 1903
 Spirostreptus confusus Chamberlin, 1941
 Spirostreptus coniferus Attems, 1903
 Spirostreptus consobrinus Humbert & Saussure, 1870
 Spirostreptus constrictus Karsch, 1881
 Spirostreptus contayanus Chamberlin, 1941
 Spirostreptus contemptus Karsch, 1881
 Spirostreptus convolutus Saussure & Zehntner, 1901
 Spirostreptus coriaceus Saussure & Zehntner, 1901
 Spirostreptus cornutus Attems, 1934
 Spirostreptus corticosus Porat, 1888
 Spirostreptus coruscus Karsch, 1881
 Spirostreptus corvinus L. Koch, 1865
 Spirostreptus costatus Voges, 1878
 Spirostreptus crassanus Karsch, 1881
 Spirostreptus crassicornis Humbert & Saussure, 1870
 Spirostreptus cristulatus Porath, 1872
 Spirostreptus cultratus Humbert & Saussure, 1870
 Spirostreptus curiosus (Silvestri, 1895)
 Spirostreptus cutipes Porath, 1872
 Spirostreptus cycnodes Karsch, 1881
 Spirostreptus damasus Attems, 1953
 Spirostreptus dartevellei (Attems, 1953)
 Spirostreptus dentiger Attems, 1953
 Spirostreptus dimidiatus Peters, 1855
 Spirostreptus doriae Pocock
 Spirostreptus dorsolineatus Sinclair
 Spirostreptus dorsostriatus Brölemann, 1901
 Spirostreptus dulitianus Pocock, 1892
 Spirostreptus ehlersi (Silvestri, 1898)
 Spirostreptus epelus Chamberlin, 1941
 Spirostreptus erythropareius Brandt, 1841
 Spirostreptus erythropleurus Pocock, 1894
 Spirostreptus everetti Pocock, 1892
 Spirostreptus everettii Pocock, 1892
 Spirostreptus excavatus Karsch, 1881
 Spirostreptus exocoeti Pocock
 Spirostreptus falcicollis Porath, 1872
 Spirostreptus falciferus Karsch, 1881
 Spirostreptus falicferus Karsch
 Spirostreptus fangaroka Saussure & Zehntner, 1901
 Spirostreptus fasciatus Newport, 1844
 Spirostreptus filum Brölemann, 1901
 Spirostreptus flavicornis Porat, 1876
 Spirostreptus flavifilis Peters, 1855
 Spirostreptus flavifrons Porath, 1872
 Spirostreptus flavofasciatus Brölemann, 1901
 Spirostreptus flavomarginatus Daday
 Spirostreptus foveatus Karsch, 1881
 Spirostreptus foveolatus Porath, 1872
 Spirostreptus fulgens Saussure & Zehntner 1902
 Spirostreptus furcata Karsch, 1881
 Spirostreptus furcatus Karsch, 1881
 Spirostreptus fuscipes Porat, 1888
 Spirostreptus galeanus Karsch, 1881
 Spirostreptus garambanus Chamberlin, 1927
 Spirostreptus geayi Brölemann, 1898
 Spirostreptus gigas Peters, 1855
 Spirostreptus glieschi Schubart, 1960
 Spirostreptus glomeratus Attems, 1934
 Spirostreptus gracilipes Newport
 Spirostreptus gracilis Daday
 Spirostreptus graeffei L. Koch, 1865
 Spirostreptus gregorius Attems, 1914
 Spirostreptus hamifer Humbert, 1865
 Spirostreptus hermosus Chamberlin, 1941
 Spirostreptus heros Porath, 1872
 Spirostreptus heterothyreus Karsch, 1881
 Spirostreptus hildebrandtianus Karsch, 1881
 Spirostreptus horridulus Karsch
 Spirostreptus horridus Karsch, 1881
 Spirostreptus hova Saussure & Zehntner, 1901
 Spirostreptus ibanda (Silvestri, 1907)
 Spirostreptus ignobilis Humbert & Saussure, 1870
 Spirostreptus iheringi Brölemann, 1901
 Spirostreptus iheringii Brölemann, 1902
 Spirostreptus immanis Attems, 1903
 Spirostreptus impressopunctatus Koch, 1867
 Spirostreptus incertelineatus (Silvestri, 1898)
 Spirostreptus inconstans Carl, 1914
 Spirostreptus indus (Linnaeus)
 Spirostreptus ineptus Kraus, 1958
 Spirostreptus inflatannulatus (Verhoeff, 1941)
 Spirostreptus informis Attems, 1938
 Spirostreptus insculptus Pocock
 Spirostreptus integer Karsch, 1884
 Spirostreptus interruptus Brölemann, 1902
 Spirostreptus intricatus Voges, 1878
 Spirostreptus jerdani Pocock
 Spirostreptus julinus Karsch, 1881
 Spirostreptus kandyanus Humbert
 Spirostreptus laevis Voges, 1878
 Spirostreptus laticaudatus Humbert & Saussure, 1870
 Spirostreptus lemniscatus Karsch, 1881
 Spirostreptus lepturus Silvestri
 Spirostreptus leucocephalus Chamberlin, 1941
 Spirostreptus limbatus Porath, 1872
 Spirostreptus lugubris Brölemann, 1901
 Spirostreptus lunelii Humbert, 1866
 Spirostreptus macracanthus Attems, 1914
 Spirostreptus macrotis Gerstäcker, 1873
 Spirostreptus macrourus Humbert & Saussure, 1870
 Spirostreptus maculatus Karsch, 1881
 Spirostreptus makarius Attems, 1914
 Spirostreptus malabaricus Gervais
 Spirostreptus manyemanus Attems, 1927
 Spirostreptus marginatus Porath, 1872
 Spirostreptus marginescaber Karsch, 1884
 Spirostreptus maritimus Koch, 1867
 Spirostreptus marus Karsch, 1881
 Spirostreptus mathematicus Karsch, 1881
 Spirostreptus medjensis Chamberlin, 1927
 Spirostreptus meinerti Porath, 1872
 Spirostreptus melanopus Porath, 1872
 Spirostreptus mellitus Karsch, 1881
 Spirostreptus mentaveinsis Silvestri
 Spirostreptus meracus Karsch, 1881
 Spirostreptus micromelas Saussure & Zehntner, 1902
 Spirostreptus micus Karsch, 1881
 Spirostreptus mitellatus Karsch, 1881
 Spirostreptus modestus Humbert
 Spirostreptus molleri Verhoeff, 1892
 Spirostreptus montanus Attems, 1909
 Spirostreptus montivagus Karsch, 1881
 Spirostreptus moseleyi Pocock
 Spirostreptus msalaensis Kraus, 1958
 Spirostreptus multiplicatus Karsch, 1879
 Spirostreptus multisulcatus Demange, 1957
 Spirostreptus nattereri Humbert & Saussure, 1870
 Spirostreptus nebularius Kraus, 1958
 Spirostreptus nigrolabiatus Newport, 1844
 Spirostreptus notatus Porath, 1872
 Spirostreptus nutans C. L. Koch, 1847
 Spirostreptus oatesi Pocock, 1893
 Spirostreptus opistheurys Attems, 1902
 Spirostreptus orellanus Chamberlin, 1941
 Spirostreptus ornatus Peters, 1855
 Spirostreptus pachyurus Pocock, 1894
 Spirostreptus pancratius Attems, 1914
 Spirostreptus paraensis Humbert & Saussure, 1870
 Spirostreptus pardalis Gerstäcker, 1873
 Spirostreptus patruelis Porat, 1888
 Spirostreptus perakensis Pocock
 Spirostreptus perfidelis (Schubart, 1944)
 Spirostreptus perfidus Brölemann, 1902
 Spirostreptus perlucens Brölemann, 1902
 Spirostreptus phthisicus Saussure & Zehntner, 1902
 Spirostreptus pictus Karsch, 1879
 Spirostreptus plananus Karsch, 1881
 Spirostreptus plicaticollis Karsch, 1881
 Spirostreptus plicatulatus Karsch, 1881
 Spirostreptus plumaceus Voges, 1878
 Spirostreptus politus Daday
 Spirostreptus ponderosus Karsch, 1881
 Spirostreptus praetextus Porat, 1872
 Spirostreptus pratextus Porath, 1872
 Spirostreptus princeps Brölemann, 1902
 Spirostreptus procerus Attems, 1934
 Spirostreptus procerus Gerstäcker, 1873
 Spirostreptus pseudofuscipes Brölemann, 1903
 Spirostreptus puncticaudus Porath, 1872
 Spirostreptus punctilabrum Newport
 Spirostreptus punctulatus Karsch, 1881
 Spirostreptus pygidialis Schubart, 1944
 Spirostreptus pyrocephalus L. Koch, 1865
 Spirostreptus pyrrhozonus Gerstaecker, 1873
 Spirostreptus regis Pocock
 Spirostreptus repandus Karsch, 1881
 Spirostreptus rolini (Silvestri, 1897)
 Spirostreptus rostratus Voges, 1878
 Spirostreptus rotundanus Karsch, 1881
 Spirostreptus rubripes Sinclair
 Spirostreptus rugifer Voges, 1878
 Spirostreptus ruralis Carl, 1914
 Spirostreptus rusticus (Attems, 1950)
 Spirostreptus rutilans Voges, 1878
 Spirostreptus sakalava Saussure & Zehntner, 1902
 Spirostreptus sanctus (Silvestri, 1897)
 Spirostreptus sanguineus Koch
 Spirostreptus scaliger Gerstaecker, 1873
 Spirostreptus sculptus Saussure & Zehntner, 1902
 Spirostreptus sebae Brandt, 1833
 Spirostreptus sebastianus Brölemann, 1902
 Spirostreptus segmentatus Voges, 1878
 Spirostreptus selenoderus O. F. Cook
 Spirostreptus semicinctus Brölemann, 1902
 Spirostreptus semicylindricus Voges, 1878
 Spirostreptus semiglobosus Voges 1878
 Spirostreptus semilunaris Peters, 1855
 Spirostreptus sepia Brölemann, 1896
 Spirostreptus servatius Attems, 1914
 Spirostreptus setosus Voges, 1878
 Spirostreptus sicarius Attems, 1934
 Spirostreptus sinuaticollis Porat, 1894
 Spirostreptus solitarius Carl, 1909
 Spirostreptus specificus Karsch, 1881
 Spirostreptus spirobolinus Karsch, 1881
 Spirostreptus splendidus Attems, 1950
 Spirostreptus stenorhynchus Pocock, 1893
 Spirostreptus strangulatus Humbert & Saussure, 1870
 Spirostreptus striatus Hutton
 Spirostreptus strongylopygus Attems, 1950
 Spirostreptus stuhlmanni Attems, 1896
 Spirostreptus stylifer Peters, 1855
 Spirostreptus suavis Gerstäcker, 1873
 Spirostreptus subpartitus Karsch 1881
 Spirostreptus subsericeus Brölemann, 1902
 Spirostreptus sugillatus Gerstäcker, 1873
 Spirostreptus sulcanus Karsch, 1881
 Spirostreptus sulcicollis Koch
 Spirostreptus syriacus (Saussure, 1859)
 Spirostreptus teres Humbert & Saussure, 1870
 Spirostreptus tetricus Attems, 1934
 Spirostreptus thalpogenitus Karsch, 1881
 Spirostreptus tiburtius Attems, 1953
 Spirostreptus torquatus Porat
 Spirostreptus triangulicollis Attems, 1934
 Spirostreptus trichogonus Attems, 1934
 Spirostreptus triculcatus Koch
 Spirostreptus trilineatus Daday
 Spirostreptus tripartitus Cook & Collins, 1893
 Spirostreptus tristis Porat, 1888
 Spirostreptus trunculatus Karsch, 1881
 Spirostreptus tschudii Karsch, 1881
 Spirostreptus tumidens Karsch, 1881
 Spirostreptus tumuliporus Karsch, 1881
 Spirostreptus typotopyge Brölemann, 1905
 Spirostreptus ucayalus Chamberlin, 1941
 Spirostreptus unicolor Daday
 Spirostreptus ventralis Porat, 1876
 Spirostreptus vermiculus Saussure & Zehntner, 1902
 Spirostreptus versicolor Saussure & Zehntner, 1902
 Spirostreptus vittatus Newport, 1844
 Spirostreptus voeltzkowi Attems, 1910
 Spirostreptus vulgatus Porat, 1888
 Spirostreptus wahlbergi Porath, 1872
 Spirostreptus woodi Humbert & Saussure, 1870
 Spirostreptus xanthodactylus Gerstaecker, 1873
 Spirostreptus xanthopus Saussure & Zehntner, 1901
 Spirostreptus yambatanus Attems, 1934

References

Spirostreptida